Hugh MacMahon (1660–1737) was Bishop of Clogher 1707–1715 and Archbishop of Armagh 1715–1737.

Born in 1660 in the townland of Cavany, Scotshouse, County Monaghan, Ireland, the son of Colla Dubh Mac Mahon of the Dartry branch of the clan and Eibhlin O'Reilly, the daughter of Colonel Philip O'Reilly, the Cavan leader in the 1641 Rebellion. Hugh MacMahon was appointed as Roman Catholic Bishop of Clogher on 15 March 1707, following the death of his predecessor, Patrick Tyrrell in 1689. In 1711, he was appointed the Apostolic Administrator for the Diocese of Kilmore; he resigned from this position in 1728. On 8 July 1715 he was appointed to the position of Archbishop of Armagh. Hugh MacMahon was the first of three Clogher bishops who were, in succession, appointed to the See of Armagh. He died in Armagh on 7 August 1737.

Bishop MacMahon was one of several priests who were targets for Edward Tyrrell the priest-hunter working in Dublin and the Wicklow area around 1712.

See also
Roman Catholic Diocese of Clogher

References

Roman Catholic bishops of Clogher
18th-century Roman Catholic bishops in Ireland
1660 births
1737 deaths
People from County Monaghan
Roman Catholic archbishops of Armagh